Caryocolum tricolorella is a moth of the family Gelechiidae. It is found from Fennoscandia to the Pyrenees, Alps and Romania and from Ireland to Russia and Ukraine. 

The wingspan is about 12 mm. The head is dark fuscous, face whitish-suffused. Terminal joint of palpi almost as long as second. Forewings are ferruginous-brown, costa and termen suffused with blackish; a white rather oblique fascia at 1/4, followed by a triangular black costal blotch; a white irroration in middle of disc; second discal stigma black; an angulated
white fascia at 3/4 sometimes interrupted to form two spots, costal larger and rather posterior. Hindwings 1, light grey.

Adults are on wing from June to August.

The larvae feed on Cerastium arvense, Stellaria alsine, Stellaria media and Stellaria holostea. They mine the leaves of their host plant. The mine has the form of a full depth gallery, mainly in the base of the leaf, with irregularly scalloped sides. The frass is deposited in the oldest part of the mine. Older larvae live freely between spun terminal shoots. Larvae can be found from December to April. Young larvae are green. Older larvae are dull whitish green with five dull pink length lines and a black head.

References

Moths described in 1812
tricolorella
Moths of Europe